The School of Open Learning (SOL) is a constituent college of the University of Delhi. It was established in 1962, and offers programmes in humanities, social sciences and commerce.

Overview
The school offers undergraduate and postgraduate degree courses in the subjects of Arts/Humanities and Commerce.

Most of the students take admission here due to many of them are living far from it and most of students just needed a graduation degree as they are doing preparation for Civil Services Exam and other competition exams.

The school also has a South Study Center at South Moti Bagh, New Delhi. A degree of SOL has the same value as that of a regular college in Delhi University.

Courses

Undergraduate Courses

 B.A. Hons. English
 B.A. Program
 B.Com. Program
 B.Com. Hons.
 BBA 
Postgraduate Courses

 M.A. Political Science
 M.A. History
 MBA
 M.A. Sanskrit
 M.Com.

See also
 University of Delhi
 National Institute of Open Schooling
 Indira Gandhi National Open University

External link
 SOL
 NCWEB

References

Universities and colleges in Delhi
Distance education institutions based in India
Delhi University
Educational institutions established in 1962
1962 establishments in Delhi
Indian educational websites